The Toyota F33A engine is a  V6 diesel engine built by Toyota that was first introduced in June 2021 for the Land Cruiser. It is the first V6 diesel engine to be built by the automaker.

Despite using the same naming scheme as with the Dynamic Force family of engines, this engine is not actually part of them.

Models

F33A-FTV 
The F33A-FTV is a twin-turbocharged engine model with 15.4:1 compression ratio and common rail direct injection system.

Applications:
 2021–present Land Cruiser (FJA300)
 2022–present Lexus LX 500d (FJA310)

See also 
 Toyota Dynamic Force engine
 List of Toyota engines

References 

F33A
V6 engines
Diesel engines by model